Reggie Corner (born November 17, 1983) is a former American football cornerback who played in the National Football League (NFL). He was drafted by the Buffalo Bills in the fourth round of the 2008 NFL Draft. He played college football at Akron.

He also played for the Jacksonville Jaguars. He is now a principal in Canton, Ohio at his alma mater, Canton McKinley SR High School.

Professional career

Buffalo Bills
Corner was selected by Buffalo in the fourth round (114th overall) of the 2008 NFL Draft.

On September 3, 2011, Corner was released during final cuts. The Bills re-signed him on September 14. He became a free agent after the season.

Jacksonville Jaguars
On June 20, 2012, Corner was signed by the Jacksonville Jaguars. Corner suffered a knee injury during the first week of training camp and was placed on injured reserve.

He was released by the Jaguars on October 3, 2012.

References

External links
Jacksonville Jaguars bio
Buffalo Bills bio

1983 births
Living people
Akron Zips football players
American football cornerbacks
Buffalo Bills players
Jacksonville Jaguars players
Players of American football from Canton, Ohio